The Chalk Hill AVA is an American Viticultural Area (AVA) located in Sonoma County, California. The boundaries of the wine appellation cover the northeast corner of the Russian River Valley AVA.  The majority of vineyards are located to the east of U.S. Route 101, near the town of Windsor. The name Chalk Hill comes from the unique volcanic soil of chalky white ash which has shown itself to perform well with planting of white wine varietals like Chardonnay and Sauvignon blanc. The majority of the region's wineries are located on the western slopes of the Mayacamas Mountains.

Geography and climate
The boundaries of the Chalk Hill AVA cover  of land within the northeast corner of Russian River AVA. Many of the region's  of planted vineyard land is located along the western slopes of the Mayacamas Mountain reaching up to altitudes of 200–1300 feet (60–400 meters). Compared to the rest of the Russian River Valley, the Chalk Hill region is relatively warm due to the influence of a thermal belt that runs through the area. Harvest time often takes place in September while harvest in the surrounding regions usually takes place in October.

The area takes its name from the "chalky" white soils of the region. However the soils themselves do not contain any chalk but rather are composed of a mixture of quartzite abundant volcanic ash, sand and silty loam. The volcanic was emitted into the area by Mount St. Helena over a course of centuries, creating vineyard soils that are not very fertile and are able to restrain vigor in the vines.

References

External links
 Sonoma County Winegrape Commission appellation maps

American Viticultural Areas
American Viticultural Areas of California
American Viticultural Areas of the San Francisco Bay Area
Geography of Sonoma County, California
1983 establishments in California